Whitford G. Smith House is a historic home located at Asheville, Buncombe County, North Carolina. It was built in 1894, and is a -story, irregular plan, Queen Anne style frame dwelling. It features a wraparound porch and a myriad of projecting pyramidal or gable-roof bays. The house was divided into apartments in the 1980s.

It was listed on the National Register of Historic Places in 2005.

References

External links

Houses on the National Register of Historic Places in North Carolina
Queen Anne architecture in North Carolina
Houses completed in 1894
Houses in Asheville, North Carolina
National Register of Historic Places in Buncombe County, North Carolina